Dexippus pengi is a species of jumping spider found in China and India.

References 

Spiders described in 2020
Salticidae
Spiders of Asia